Bronchocela vietnamensis is a species of lizard. It is endemic to Vietnam

References

Bronchocela
Reptiles described in 2005
Reptiles of Vietnam
Taxa named by Jakob Hallermann
Taxa named by Nikolai Loutseranovitch Orlov